60S ribosomal protein L14 is a protein that in humans is encoded by the RPL14 gene.

Function 

Ribosomes, the organelles that catalyze protein synthesis, consist of a small 40S subunit and a large 60S subunit. Together these subunits are composed of 4 RNA species and approximately 80 structurally distinct proteins. This gene encodes a ribosomal protein that is a component of the 60S subunit. The protein belongs to the L14E family of ribosomal proteins. It contains a basic region-leucine zipper (bZIP)-like domain. The protein is located in the cytoplasm. This gene contains a trinucleotide (GCT) repeat tract whose length is highly polymorphic; these triplet repeats result in a stretch of alanine residues in the encoded protein. Transcript variants utilizing alternative polyA signals and alternative 5'-terminal exons exist but all encode the same protein. As is typical for genes encoding ribosomal proteins, there are multiple processed pseudogenes of this gene dispersed through the genome.

Interactions 

RPL14 has been shown to interact with PHLDA1.

References

External links

Further reading 

 
 
 
 
 
 
 
 
 
 
 
 
 
 

Ribosomal proteins